Thomas Locke (June 16, 1824 – January 27, 1884) was a farmer and political figure. He represented Stanstead in the Legislative Assembly of Quebec from 1867 to 1875 as a Conservative.

He was born in Barnston, Lower Canada, the son of Levi Locke and Sally Clement, both natives of New Hampshire. Locke was a captain in the militia and was mayor of Barnston in 1864 and 1865. He also served as school commissioner and justice of the peace. In 1846, he married Lydia E. Howard. Locke was defeated when he ran for reelection in 1875. He died in Barnston at the age of 59.

References 
 

1824 births
1884 deaths
Conservative Party of Quebec MNAs
Mayors of places in Quebec